Hong Kong Maritime Museum is a non-profit educational institution funded by the international shipping community and the government in Hong Kong. It is located at Central Pier 8, Hong Kong. The museum was established on 8 September in 2005 and reopened to the public in February 2013.

The museum focuses on the development of boats, ships, maritime exploration and trade, and naval warfare. While concentrating on the South China coast and its adjacent seas, it also covers global trends and provides an account of Hong Kong's maritime growth.

The museum includes semi-permanent and special exhibitions, interactive displays, educational events, a café, and a museum shop.

Murray House, the museum's first home

The museum first opened to the public on 8 September 2005, under the leadership of its board of directors, its first museum director, Stephen Davies, and the trustees of the Hong Kong Maritime Museum Trust. It was located on the ground floor of Murray House, a reconstruction of one of the first 19th-century buildings of the British colonial period. The building had been dismantled stone by stone, stored in a rural site for over a decade, and then reassembled around a modern reinforced concrete building overlooking Stanley Bay.

The museum was divided into two galleries, the ancient gallery and the modern gallery, displaying more than 500 items including models of ancient and modern ships, paintings, ceramics, trade goods and shipping documents. A model of a 2,000-year-old boat made of pottery from the Han Dynasty was one of the museum's highlights. Another treasure was the early 19th century, 18-metre long, ink-painting scroll, Pacifying the South China Sea, which relates how the Viceroy of the Two Guangs, Bailing, solved the problem of piracy on the Guangdong coast in 1809–1810. A featured highlight is the Battle of Lantau in which imperial naval forces battled Hong Kong's most famous pirate, Cheung Po Tsai (Zhang Baozai).

The ancient gallery portrayed the fortunes of Chinese shipping during ancient and dynastic times. It also illustrated how China's overseas neighbours and Western trading nations together shaped the maritime history of Asia and the regions beyond. The modern gallery explored the historical factors and the Chinese entrepreneurship that have made Hong Kong a maritime success. It covered developments in ship design, and specialisation that have changed the face of world's shipping industry and to which Hong Kong's port has had to adapt.

Between 2005 and 2011, the museum attracted an average of 35,000 visitors per year. But because of the limit on its lease of its premises, the small size of the exhibition, office and storage spaces and its relatively remote location, the museum was obliged either to close down or find an alternative location. A long period of negotiation between the museum of the Government of the Hong Kong SAR beginning in September 2007 resulted in the endorsement of the museum's bid to move its operations to Central Pier 8 in the Chief Executive's Policy Address in October 2009. The object of the relocation was to serve more people and exhibit the collection, which had been almost trebled in size during the museum's first five years.

Central Pier 8

The Hong Kong Maritime Museum renovated Central Pier 8 in 2012. Until shortly before the museum bid for the use of the vacant spaces the building was used as one of the terminals for the Star Ferry for its service to Hung Hom. The east side of the pier had also been used for non-scheduled ferry services. In August 2007 the pier's unused spaces were under tender for restaurants and kiosks. The museum submitted a proposal for converting the pier for use as a museum. This proposal was submitted in early October 2007 and was accepted by the government. The following three years saw an intensive period of consultation between HKMM and government during which the museum's initial design proposals by Dr Stephen Davies, the museum's Director at the time and the HKMM's original Murray House architects Richards Basmajian were refined. The final design of the museum premises is the outcome of the main consultants appointed for the project, P&T Architects and Engineers, with the gallery design and fit-out by Haley Sharpe Designs (UK) and Kingsmen.

The renovation projects represented a partnership with the Hong Kong Government and many of Hong Kong's maritime community. The move allowed the museum to expand its gallery spaces to fifteen with an additional two galleries for special exhibitions and for hosting special events. The museum was also to have a café.

The South China Morning Post reported that the Hong Kong government partly financed the HK$115 million renovation project. Richard Wesley, the Hong Kong Maritime Museum's second Director, said at the blessing ceremony that this project "marks the culmination of an enormous amount of work by board members and trustees of the HK Maritime Museum to create a truly high-class maritime museum in the Central waterfront. We are very grateful to the many shipping companies who have backed the museum financially since its birth in 2005, and of course the government." Since the museum's opening in 2005 the collection had been built from some 700 objects to over 2000 and the library had gone from 15 books to over 1500.

The display space at Pier 8 is more than five times the area of the Hong Kong Maritime's first location. It was forecast that the new museum would receive around 140,000 visitors a year but the difficulties of the site out on a limb from the Central business district, which closes at weekends, has proved a deterrent to visitation. Nonetheless, the museum has flourished and Café 8, as the new café is called, has become the home of Hong Kong's Café Scientifique.

Galleries of Pier 8

The gallery spaces are filled with some of Hong Kong's most interesting cultural heritage objects. Themes explored in the galleries include: China's maritime heritage, the Canton Trade, the Pirate Coast, Hong Kong's harbour, the evolution of China's modern maritime world, relations with foreign powers, maritime communications, charting, navigation and pilotage, recreational uses of the water, the underwater world, the sounds of the sea, shipping today, port development and safety at sea and Chinese marine art.

Each of the galleries has been set up with the help and support of individuals and corporations in the maritime industry, who believe that the preservation of Hong Kong's maritime history should be a priority.

One of the highlights of the museum is a painted scroll that depicts historical events of piracy in China. The scroll is one of Hong Kong's most important historical artefacts and one of the jewels of the museum's collection. It was painted in the early 19th century by an unknown artist to commemorate the defeat of the pirates who prowled the waters around Guangdong in the mid-Jiaqing period (1796–1820). The scroll is prominently displayed in the new Sea Bandits Gallery, in addition to the original, museum visitors have the opportunity to examine a digitised version of the scroll in minute detail.

Other highlights include four paintings painted in Macau in the late 18th century, styled the 'Gentiloni Paintings'. They are of Macau, Whampoa (Huangpu), Guangzhou and Zhaoqing and had arrived in Rio de Janeiro, Brazil by 1810 when the lay secretary to the Papal Legate to the Portuguese Imperial court bought or was given them. They remained in the family until 2010, when they were purchased for the people of Hong Kong thanks to a donation from Fairmont Shipping.

The magnificent 'General' Cannon in the Pacific Basin Sea Bandits Gallery was captured at Humen in the very first engagement of the First Opium War in 1841. Taken back to Britain, initially stored in the Tower of London and eventually a garden ornament, it was purchased by HKMM in 2010 thanks to a donation by Mr Kenneth K.W. Lo and brought back to its original home waters.

Thanks to the Surveying and Mapping Office Training School of the Lands Department of the HKSAR, the HIT Viewing Gallery has the 'Rifleman's Bolt', preserving a small but vital part of Hong Kong's maritime and general cartographic heritage.

Generous donors and lenders have ensured that the museum's galleries are full of mementoes to Hong Kong's long, important, varied and intriguing maritime story – from the very first modern chart of Hong Kong (unknown until HKMM helped to identify it in 2007), through stunning arrays of ship portraits and ship models, to one of the earliest of the modern chronometers that opened up the modern globalised maritime world, and a windsurfer used by Hong Kong's Hayley Chan Hei Man in the 2012 Olympic Games.

The galleries have over 25 interactive screens using the latest technology to introduce visitors to the vast range of stories and topics at the heart of Hong Kong's – and the world's – maritime story.

See also
 List of museums in Hong Kong
 Port of Hong Kong
 Intermodal container
 Ship model
 Tung Chao-yung
 Yue-Kong Pao

References

External links

 Hong Kong Maritime Museum – Official site
 Hong Kong Maritime Museum – flickr page
 Hong Kong Maritime Museum- YouTube Channel
 Hong Kong Maritime Museum - Google Cultural Institute

Museums in Hong Kong
Maritime museums in Hong Kong
Stanley, Hong Kong